Boris Gnjidić (born October 9, 1967) is a Croatian  former basketball player who played as forward. Currently he work as sport director of KK Dubrava.

Basketball career 
Gnjidić played from 1992 to 2001 in first Croatian division for teams Zagreb, Olimpija Osijek and Dubrava.

He was key player for KRKA from 2001 to 2004. He won Slovenian League in season 2002-03 and team captain (2003-04).

On July 29, 2004, he signed one-year contract with Laško.

Career statistics

EuroLeague

|-
| style="text-align:left;"| 2001–02
| style="text-align:left;"| KRKA Novo Mesto
| 14 || 13 || 28.5 || .504 || .471 || .828 || 4.0 || .9 || 1.0 || .3 || 11.6 || 10.6
|-
| style="text-align:left;"| 2003–04
| style="text-align:left;"| KRKA Novo Mesto
| 10 || 6 || 17.1 || .404 || .375 || .813 || 1.2 || .8 || 1.2 || .2 || 6.0 || 4.0
|- class="sortbottom"
| style="text-align:center;" colspan=2| Career
| 24 || 19 || 23.2 || .475 || .440 || .822 || 2.8 || .9 || 1.1 || .3 || 9.3 || 7.6

References

External links 
Boris Gnjidic at euroleague.net
Boris Gnjidic at fiba.com

1967 births
Living people
ABA League players
Croatian men's basketball players
KK Krka players
Croatian expatriate sportspeople in Slovenia
KK Dubrava players